Bartonella taylorii is a bacterium. As with other Bartonella species, it can cause disease in animals.

References

External links
Bartonella-Associated Infections – CDC
Bartonella species - List of Prokaryotic names with Standing in Nomenclature
Bartonella taylorii on Culture Collection, University of Göteborg, Sweden
Type strain of Bartonella taylorii at BacDive -  the Bacterial Diversity Metadatabase

Gram-negative bacteria
Bartonellaceae
Bacteria described in 1995